Butastur is a genus of birds of prey in the family Accipitridae.

Taxonomy and species
The genus Butastur was introduced in 1843 by the English naturalist Brian Houghton Hodgson with the white-eyed buzzard as the type species. The genus name is a portmanteau of the genus Buteo introduced by Bernard Germain de Lacépède for the buzzards and Astur introduced by Lacépède for the goshawks. The genus now contains four species.

References

 
Bird genera
Taxonomy articles created by Polbot